Oxcroft is a small hamlet in Bolsover (district), Derbyshire in England, located to the north of Bolsover, about 1–2 miles along the Clowne-New Houghton Road. It consists of a few farms and cottages.

Etymology: Probably simply meaning an Ox cottage/farm. Ox = Ox, Croft = Farm/Cottage.

Bolsover District
Hamlets in Derbyshire